FRD may refer to:

 Cuban Democratic Revolutionary Front (Spanish ), an anti-Castro organization
 Federal Research Division of the United States Library of Congress
 Federal Rules Decisions, a United States reporter of legal opinions
 Fordata language, spoken in Indonesia
 Formula Racing Development Limited, a motorsport promoter
 Free Radical Design, a British game developer
 Free Rapid Downloader software
 Friday Harbor Airport in Washington, United States
 Frodsham railway station in England
 Fumarate reductase (menaquinone)
 Fund for Reconciliation and Development, an American philanthropic organization
 New Democratic Spirit, an Albanian political party
 Focus receptor distance in projectional radiography
 Functional Requirement Document; see functional requirement
 falling rate determination (science/technology)